Edmund Beckett, 1st Baron Grimthorpe, KC (12 May 1816 – 29 April 1905), known previously as Sir Edmund Beckett, 5th Baronet and Edmund Beckett Denison, was a "lawyer, mechanician and controversialist" as well as a noted horologist and architect.

Biography
Beckett was born at Carlton Hall near Newark, Nottinghamshire, England, and was the eldest son of Sir Edmund Beckett, 4th Baronet, MP for the West Riding of Yorkshire.

He was educated at Doncaster Grammar School for Boys (briefly), then Eton, and went on to read mathematics at Trinity College, Cambridge, where he graduated in the 1838 Tripos with the rank of "30th Wrangler".

Beckett began practising law in 1841 at Lincoln's Inn. He was made a Queen's Counsel in 1854, retiring in 1881. He was elected to the Royal Astronomical Society in 1866. He was elected to the presidency of the British Horological Institute in 1868, a position he accepted on the condition that he should not be asked to attend dinners. He was re-elected annually until his death. In 1877 he was appointed Chancellor and Vicar-General of the Diocese of York. He was created Baron Grimthorpe in 1886. He is sometimes known as Edmund Beckett Denison; his father had taken the additional name Denison in 1816, but the son dropped it on his father's death in 1874. He married Fanny Catherine (23 February 1823 – 8 December 1901), daughter of John Lonsdale, 89th Bishop of Lichfield.

In 1851, he designed the mechanism for the clock of the Palace of Westminster (the Houses of Parliament in London), responsible for the chimes of Big Ben.

In 1868 he worked with W. H. Crossland to design St Chad's Church, Far Headingley in Leeds on land given by his family.

He was also responsible throughout the 1880s and 1890s for rebuilding the west front, roof, and transept windows of St Albans Cathedral at his own expense. Although the building had been in need of repair (and indeed considerable work had already been done since 1856 under the guidance of Sir George Gilbert Scott until his death in 1878, including making the central tower safe, correcting the listing of the south side of the nave, and reconstructing the shrine of Saint Alban), popular opinion at the time held that he had changed the cathedral's character, even inspiring the creation and temporary popularity of the verb "to grimthorpe", meaning to carry out unsympathetic restorations of ancient buildings. Part of Beckett's additions included statues of the four evangelists around the western door; the statue of St Matthew has Beckett's face. He later turned his attentions to St Peter's and then to St Michael's churches, both in the same city. He lived at Batchwood Hall from where he oversaw the restoration work on the cathedral.

He died on 29 April 1905 after a fall, and is buried in the grounds of St Albans Cathedral. His obituary in the Monthly Notices of the Royal Astronomical Society noted his mastery of ecclesiastical law, his publications (ranging from Astronomy without Mathematics to Clocks, Watches, and Bells (1903) to Building, Civil and Ecclesiastical) and noted "there was not a better locksmith in England."

Quotation 

 "I am the only architect with whom I have never quarrelled."

Religious publications
Six Letters on Dr. Todd's Discourses on the Prophecies Relating to Antichrist in the Apocalypse (1848)
On the Origin of the Laws of Nature (1880)
Should the Revised New Testament be Authorised? (1882)
The Life of John Lonsdale, Bishop of Lichfield With Some of His Writings (1868)
A Review of Hume and Huxley on Miracles (1883)

Other works
 Astronomy Without Mathematics (1871)

Arms

References

External links 

 
 
 
 
 
 

1816 births
1905 deaths
People from Newark and Sherwood (district)
19th-century English architects
Barons in the Peerage of the United Kingdom
People educated at Eton College
People from St Albans
Burials at St Albans Cathedral
Alumni of Trinity College, Cambridge
Deaths from falls
Chancellors of the Diocese of York
Architects from Nottinghamshire
Peers of the United Kingdom created by Queen Victoria
English King's Counsel
20th-century King's Counsel
19th-century King's Counsel
Members of Lincoln's Inn
Edmund, 1st Baron Grimthorpe
English barristers